Lancelot Walker (26 November 1829 – 19 May 1907) was a 19th-century Member of Parliament in New Zealand.

Walker was born in 1829 to Thomas and Constantia Anne Walker of Co York, England. He served in the British Army in India, although in which regiment or unit is unclear.

Walker came to New Zealand in 1856. He lived at Four Peaks, Geraldine, Canterbury, where he died.

Walker represented the  electorate from the  after the resignation of Augustus White to 1866, when he was defeated by George Armstrong by just four votes at the  held on 21 February. A few days later on 2 March, he won election in the  electorate, which he represented until he resigned in 1867. On 15 May 1885, he was appointed to the New Zealand Legislative Council, where he served until his death on 19 May 1907.

References

1829 births
1907 deaths
Members of the New Zealand Legislative Council
Members of the New Zealand House of Representatives
New Zealand MPs for South Island electorates
Members of the Canterbury Provincial Council
Unsuccessful candidates in the 1866 New Zealand general election